The Rwandan Ministry of Defence is in charge of the Rwanda Defence Force. The Minister of Defence is responsible for the conduct and implementation of defence programmes. The current Minister of Defence is Major General Albert Murasira since October 2018.Lt.-Col. Innocent Gashugi is Permanent Secretary. Gen. Patrick Nyamvumba is Chief of Defence Staff.

History

List of Ministers of Defence

Source: Ministry of Defence, Republic of Rwanda.

References

External links 

 

Defence
Rwanda